ACF Fiorentina returned to Serie A, following a two-year absence after the bankruptcy of the previous incarnation of the club. Fiorentina returned only due to the expansion in terms of the number of top-league teams, and therefore had to significantly strengthen the squad in pre-season. Dario Dainelli, Giorgio Chiellini, Hidetoshi Nakata, Fabrizio Miccoli, Martin Jørgensen, goalkeeper Cristiano Lupatelli, Enzo Maresca, Tomáš Ujfaluši and Javier Portillo were among the highly rated players to sign up for Fiorentina, either permanently or on loan. With this squad, Fiorentina was expected to challenge for a place on the top half of the table, but slipped into the relegation battle that affected more than half of the Serie A clubs during the dramatic season. In the end, a strong finish to the season under incoming coach Dino Zoff saved La Viola from relegation, with an emotional 3–0 victory against Brescia confirming their survival.

Players

Goalkeepers
  Sebastián Cejas
  Marco Roccati
  Cristiano Lupatelli
  Francesco Palmieri

Defenders
  Dario Dainelli
  Giorgio Chiellini
  Mirko Savini
  Tomáš Ujfaluši
  Christian Maggio
  Daniele Delli Carri
  William Viali
  Antonio Aquilanti

Midfielders
  Christian Obodo
  Luis Helguera
  Angelo Di Livio
  Luca Ariatti
  Hidetoshi Nakata
  Enzo Maresca
  Martin Jørgensen
  Marco Donadel
  Luigi Piangerelli
  Gaetano Fontana

Forwards
  Christian Riganò
  Fabrizio Miccoli
  Javier Portillo
  Giampaolo Pazzini
  Enrico Fantini
  Valeri Bojinov

Competitions

Overall

Last updated: 29 May 2005

Serie A

League table

Results summary

Results by round

Matches

Coppa Italia

Statistics

Appearances and goals

|-
! colspan="14" style="background:#9400D3; color:#FFFFFF; text-align:center"| Goalkeepers
|-
! colspan="14" style="background:#9400D3; color:#FFFFFF; text-align:center"| Defenders
|-
! colspan="14" style="background:#9400D3; color:#FFFFFF; text-align:center"| Midfielders
|-
! colspan="14" style="background:#9400D3; color:#FFFFFF; text-align:center"| Forwards
|-
! colspan="14" style="background:#9400D3; color:#FFFFFF; text-align:center"| Players transferred out during the season

Goalscorers

Last updated:

Clean sheets

Last updated:

Disciplinary record

Last updated:

References

ACF Fiorentina seasons
Fiorentina